Bràfim is a municipality in the comarca of Alt Camp, province of Tarragona, Catalonia, in north-eastern Spain. This town produces quite good table wine.

References

 Panareda Clopés, Josep Maria; Rios Calvet, Jaume; Rabella Vives, Josep Maria (1989). Guia de Catalunya, Barcelona: Caixa de Catalunya.  (Spanish).  (Catalan).

External links

 Bràfim Town Hall webpage
  Bràfim information
 Government data pages 

Municipalities in Alt Camp
Populated places in Alt Camp